A number of units of measurements were used in Latvia to measure length, mass, area, and so on.  Russian and local measures were used since 1845, and the former system before those, was that of the Netherlands.

System before metric system

A number of units were used in Russian and local systems.

Length

Units included:

1 elle = 0.537 m

1 quartier =  elle

1 meile = 7 verste (Russian) = 7.468 km.

Mass

One pfund was equal to 0.419 kg.

Area

One kapp was equal to 148.64 2. Some other units included:

1 pourvete = 25 kapp

1 loofstelle = 25 kapp

1 tonnstelle = 35 kapp.

Volume

One faden was equal to 4.077 m3.

Capacity

One stoof was equal to 1.2752 L.  Some other units included:

1 kanne = 2 stoof

1 kulmet = 9 stoof

1 anker = 30 stoof

1 poure = 54 stoof

1 loof = 54 stoof

1 tonne = 108 stoof.

References

Latvian culture
Latvia